Judit Turóczy (also known as Korach; born March 11, 1948, in Budapest) is a former freestyle swimmer from Hungary, who competed in three consecutive Summer Olympics for her native country, starting in 1964.

Her best individual result was eighth, achieved at the 1968 Olympic Games in 100 metres freestyle. With the Hungarian 4×100 metres freestyle relay team she was fourth at the 1964 and the 1972 Games and fifth in 1968.

At the European Championships she won two silver medals.

References

1948 births
Living people
Olympic swimmers of Hungary
Hungarian female freestyle swimmers
Swimmers at the 1964 Summer Olympics
Swimmers at the 1968 Summer Olympics
Swimmers at the 1972 Summer Olympics
Swimmers from Budapest
European Aquatics Championships medalists in swimming
20th-century Hungarian women
21st-century Hungarian women